The 1998 Kroger St. Jude International was a men's tennis tournament played on indoor Hard courts in Memphis, United States, that was part of the International Series Gold of the 1998 ATP Tour. It was the 28th edition of the tournament and was held 16–22 February 1998.

Seeds
Champion seeds are indicated in bold text while text in italics indicates the round in which those seeds were eliminated.

Draw

Finals

Top half

Bottom half

References

U.S. National Indoor Championships
Doubles